Rawnina (also known as Ravnina) is a town in Mary, Turkmenistan.

References

Populated places in Mary Region